The 15 cm Feldkanone L/40 in Räderlafette (40-caliber Field Gun on Wheeled Carriage) was a heavy field gun used by Germany in World War I. It was an ex-naval gun hastily adapted for land service by rigidly mounting it in a field carriage.

History
The Germans were desperate for long-range artillery by 1915 and were forced to adapt a number of ex-naval guns for Army use, details of which are often lacking. The 15-cm SK L/40 (SK = Schnelladekanone or quick loading cannon) was an obsolete gun that was used as the secondary armament by pre-dreadnought battleships. It seems that there were actually two versions of this gun, one with an L/40 and the other with an L/45 barrel and the layout of the recoil mechanism differs between the two. It is not known if the designation changed depending on the barrel. For transport purposes, it was broken down into three loads; barrel, carriage and firing platform.

While details are unclear, it seems that this gun was also adapted for land use, complete with its armored gunhouse, as the 15 cm KiSL (Kanone in Schirmlafette). It was mounted on a central pivot, which was in turn mounted on a firing platform. It was transported by rail or by road to its firing location in one piece and then offloaded onto the firing platform by crane.

It retained the Navy's (Kaiserliche Marine) semi-fixed ammunition, where one bag of powder was loaded before the brass cartridge containing the rest of the propellant and the primer.

At the final stages of the World War I at least 6 guns were ceded to Bulgaria.

See also

Weapons of comparable role, performance and era
BL 6 inch Mk VII naval gun The British equivalent World War I naval gun modified for field use.

References 

 Hogg, Ian. Twentieth-Century Artillery. New York: Barnes & Noble Books, 2000 
 Jäger, Herbert. German Artillery of World War One. Ramsbury, Marlborough, Wiltshire: Crowood Press, 2001

External links
 15 cm FK L/40 i.R.L. on Landships
 List and pictures of World War I surviving 15cm L/40 and L/45 i.R. guns

World War I artillery of Germany
150 mm artillery